The Ameki Formation is a Lutetian to Bartonian geological formation located in Nigeria. It belongs to the Bende-Ameki Group. Ameki Formation is also a group that consists of two formations namely Nnanka Formation, Nsugbe Formation.

Fossil content 
Among others, the following fossils have been reported in the formation:
 Pappocetus lugardi
 Cosmochelys dolloi
 Gigantornis eaglesomei

See also 
 List of fossil sites

References

Further reading 
  (1993); Wildlife of Gondwana. Reed. 

Geologic formations of Nigeria
Eocene Series of Africa
Shale formations